Bojan Golubović (Serbian Cyrillic: Бојан Голубовић; born 22 August 1983) is a Bosnian former professional footballer who played as a forward.

Career

Ceahlăul Piatra Neamț

In January 2012 Golubović signed with Romanian Liga I club Ceahlăul Piatra Neamț.

He helped save his team avoid relegation, scoring 10 goals in 16 matches, and becoming the team's top goalscorer. In the 2012–13 Liga I season, Golubovic played in 33 games and scored 11 goals, being once again the team's top goalscorer. On 27 May 2013 he scored the only goal in a match against Politehnica Iași, a goal that mathematically saved Ceahlăul from relegation.

Career statistics

Club

Statistics accurate as of match played 29 March 2019

Honours

Club
Steaua București
League Cup: 2015–16

References

External links
 
 

1983 births
Living people
People from Konjic
Association football forwards
Bosnia and Herzegovina footballers
FK Leotar players
NK Međimurje players
RNK Split players
CSM Ceahlăul Piatra Neamț players
SønderjyskE Fodbold players
FC Politehnica Iași (2010) players
FC Steaua București players
CS Gaz Metan Mediaș players
FC Botoșani players
FK Krupa players
Premier League of Bosnia and Herzegovina players
Croatian Football League players
Liga I players
Danish Superliga players
Bosnia and Herzegovina expatriate footballers
Expatriate footballers in Serbia
Expatriate footballers in Croatia
Expatriate footballers in Romania
Expatriate men's footballers in Denmark
Bosnia and Herzegovina expatriate sportspeople in Serbia
Bosnia and Herzegovina expatriate sportspeople in Croatia
Bosnia and Herzegovina expatriate sportspeople in Romania
Bosnia and Herzegovina expatriate sportspeople in Denmark